Thousandsticks is an unincorporated community in Leslie County, Kentucky, United States. Thousandsticks had a post office with ZIP code 41766  which closed in 2005.

History
A post office called Thousandsticks has been in operation since 1924. The community was named after nearby Thousandsticks Branch.

References

Unincorporated communities in Leslie County, Kentucky
Unincorporated communities in Kentucky
Coal towns in Kentucky